Bakharow  باخرو is a village in Badakhshan Province in north-eastern Afghanistan.

References

Populated places in Kuf Ab District